Song for Alpha is the second studio album by English electronic musician Daniel Avery. It was released on 6 April 2018 under Mute Records in the United States and Canada, and Phantasy Sound for worldwide.

Accolades

Critical reception
Song for Alpha was met with universal acclaim reviews from critics. At Metacritic, which assigns a weighted average rating out of 100 to reviews from mainstream publications, this release received an average score of 84, based on 17 reviews.

Track listing

Charts

References

2018 albums
Daniel Avery (musician) albums
Mute Records albums
Phantasy (record label) albums